Natalie MacLean is an accomplished Canadian Wine Expert, winner of the James Beard Award and author of New York Times Best Selling book 'Red, White and Drunk All Over' (a wine review) and others books. In Spring 2023 her latest book 'Wine Witch on Fire' exposes the downside of the Wine Industry and it's effect on those who toil in it.

Career
In addition to her work published in the books Red, White, and Drunk All Over (2006) and Unquenchable (2011) in her e-newsletters and on her website, MacLean's writing has been included in publications such as Epicurious, The Guardian, The Age, The Huffington Post, BusinessWeek, Chicago Tribune, and Ottawa Citizen.

MacLean's website membership has been estimated to over 145,000 subscribers. Among her awards are the Louis Roederer 2009 Online Wine Writer of the Year and the Jacob's Creek Awards 2003 World's Best Drink Writer.

References

External links
"Nat Decants", Natalie MacLean official site

Year of birth missing (living people)
Living people
Canadian non-fiction writers
Wine critics
James Beard Foundation Award winners